Prozac+ is an Italian punk band, founded in Pordenone in 1995. As with the Canadian band Prozzäk, they are named for the brand name of the antidepressant fluoxetine by Eli Lilly and Company.

History
The band's three founding members are Gian Maria "GM" Accusani (guitarist and singer), Eva Poles (singer), and Elisabetta Imelio (bassist).  Imelio died of breast cancer on March 1, 2020.

Their second album, Acido Acida, released by EMI, sold 175,000 copies and hit platinum charts. 
Album's track Acida became the most important Summer hit of 1998, a record for the punk rock genre.

Discography
 Testa plastica (1996) (Plastic Head)
 Baby EP (1997)
 Acido Acida (1998)
 3Prozac+ (2000)
 3Prozac+ English Version (2000)
 Miodio (2002) ("ohmygod")
 Gioia nera (2004) (Black Joy)

References

Italian punk rock groups